Cyclomenia is a genus of solenogaster, a kind of shell-less, worm-like mollusk.

Species
 Cyclomenia holosericea Nierstrasz, 1902

References

  Vaught, K.C.; Tucker Abbott, R.; Boss, K.J. (1989). A classification of the living Mollusca. American Malacologists: Melbourne. ISBN 0-915826-22-4. XII, 195 pp

External links
 Nierstrasz, H. (1902). The Solenogastres of the Siboga-Expedition. Siboga-Expeditie. 47: 1-46

Solenogastres